The following is a timeline of the history of the city of Graz, Austria.

Prior to 14th century
 1180 – Graz becomes capital of the Duchy of Styria.
 1239 – Graz Friary active.

14th–16th centuries
 1379 – Graz becomes capital of Inner Austria; Leopold III in power.
 1438 – Graz Castle built.
 1462 – Graz Cathedral built.
 1560 – Clock tower built on the Schlossberg.
 1585 – University of Graz founded.
 1588 – Belltower built on the Schlossberg.
 1590 – Dobel Castle built.

17th–18th centuries
 1619 – Habsburg Ferdinand II becomes Holy Roman Emperor; relocates from Graz to Vienna.
 1635 – Eggenberg Palace built (approximate date).
 1640 – Mausoleum of Ferdinand II, Holy Roman Emperor consecrated.
 1645 – Styrian Armoury built.
 1652 – Grabenkirche (church) dedicated.
 1724 – Mariatrost Basilica (church) built.
 1776 – Schauspielhaus Graz (theatre) built.
 1780 – Count John D'Alton becomes Governor. 
 1786 – Catholic See of Seckau prince-bishop residence relocated to Graz.
 1794 – Prison in use.
 1797 – French in power.

19th century
 1809 – June: Battle of Graz.
 1811
 Landesmuseum Joanneum (museum) established.
 Graz University of Technology founded by Archduke John of Austria
 1816 – Music school established.
 1823 – Population: 40,000 (approximate).
 1828 – Graz Mutual Insurance Company founded.
 1844 – Southern Railway in operation (approximate date).
 1847 – Central Railway Station opens.
 1850 – Historical Society of Styria founded.
 1855 – Grazer Telegraf newspaper begins publication.
 1864 – Technical High School and Thalía Theatre active.
 1872 – Grazer Waggon- & Maschinen-Fabriks-Aktiengesellschaft (manufacturer) in business.
 1876 – Steiermärkische Fechtklub (fencing club) founded.
 1878 – Horse trams begin operating.
 1885 – Grazer Congress (concert hall) built.
 1887 – Sacred Heart of Jesus Church built.
 1888 - Grazer Alpenclub (hiking club) formed.
 1889 – Club der Amateurfotografen (photography club) founded.
 1894 – Schlossbergbahn funicular railway begins operating.
 1899
 Graz Opera house inaugurated.
 Electric tram begins operating.
 1900 – Population: 138,370.

20th century

1900s–1950s
 1902 – Grazer AK (sports club) formed.
 1904 – Kleine Zeitung newspaper begins publication.
 1909
 SK Sturm Graz (football club) formed.
 Grand Hotel Wiesler in business.
 1912 – LKH-Universitätsklinikum (hospital) built.
 1913 – Volkskundemuseum (folkloric museum) opens.
 1914 – September: Talerhof concentration camp in operation near city.
 1919 – Vinzenz Muchitsch becomes mayor.
 1920 - Population: 157,032.
 1925 – Graz Airport active.
 1938
 February: City becomes part of Nazi Germany.
 Julius Kaspar becomes mayor.
 1941 – Trolleybuses begin operating.
 1945
 Allied occupation of Austria begins; Styria overseen by British forces.
 Eduard Speck becomes mayor.
 Die Wahrheit communist newspaper begins publication.
 1951
 Population: 226,476.
 Die Aula magazine begins publication.
 1955 – July: Allied occupation of Austria ends per Austrian State Treaty.

1960s–1990s
 1960
 Gustav Scherbaum becomes mayor.
 Hafnerriegel (residence building) constructed.
 Forum Stadtpark (art gallery) opens.
 1963 – Eisstadion Liebenau (sports arena) built.
 1971 – Tramway Museum Graz founded.
 1973 – Alexander Götz becomes mayor.
 1985 – Alfred Stingl becomes mayor.
 1993 – Nausner & Nausner Verlag (publisher) in business.
 1995 – Das Megaphon newspaper begins publication.
 1997 – Schwarzenegger-Stadium opens.
 1998
 Diagonale film festival active.
 Schreibkraft magazine founded.
 1999 – Old Town designated an UNESCO World Heritage Site.

21st century

 2001
 Magna Steyr automobile manufacturer headquartered in Graz.
 Springfestival begins.
 2002 – Stadthalle Graz (assembly hall) opens.
 2003
 Graz Art Museum built.
 City designated a European Capital of Culture.
 Murinsel (amphitheatre) opens.
 Homeless World Cup football contest held.
 Siegfried Nagl becomes mayor.
 2005 – Elevate Festival begins.
 2007
 Rondo built.
 Einkaufszentrum Murpark (shopping mall) in business.
 2013 – Population: 265,778.
 2015 – A van and knife attack kills three and injures 36.
 2016 Overnight stays in Graz Hotels exceed 1.1 million for the first time

See also
 Graz history
 
 
 
 History of Styria
 Timelines of other cities in Austria: Linz, Salzburg, Vienna

References

This article incorporates information from the German Wikipedia.

Bibliography

published in 17th-19th centuries
 
 
 
 

 

published in 20th century
 
  (+ 1871 ed., 1907 ed.)

External links

 Items related to Graz, various dates (via Europeana)

Graz
graz